Starch phosphorylase is a form of phosphorylase similar to glycogen phosphorylase, except that it acts upon starch instead of glycogen.

The plant alpha-glucan phosphorylase, commonly called starch phosphorylase (EC 2.4.1.1), is largely known for the phosphorolytic degradation of starch. Starch phosphorylase catalyzes the reversible transfer of glucosyl units from glucose-1-phosphate to the nonreducing end of alpha-1,4-D-glucan chains with the release of phosphate. Two distinct forms of starch phosphorylase, plastidic phosphorylase and cytosolic phosphorylase, have been consistently observed in higher plants.

External links
 
 http://www.genome.ad.jp/dbget-bin/www_bget?ko+K00688
 Rathore RS, Garg N, Garg S, Kumar A.
Crit Rev Biotechnol. 2009;29(3):214-24.
Starch phosphorylase: role in starch metabolism and biotechnological applications.
 http://informahealthcare.com/doi/abs/10.1080/07388550902926063

Transferases
EC 2.4.1